Piotr Mandrysz (born 21 September 1962) is a Polish football manager and former player who played as a defender.

References

1962 births
Living people
Polish footballers
Association football midfielders
GKS Jastrzębie players
Zagłębie Sosnowiec players
Pogoń Szczecin players
SKN St. Pölten players
Raków Częstochowa players
Śląsk Wrocław players
RKS Radomsko players
Ekstraklasa players
I liga players
Polish expatriate footballers
Expatriate footballers in Austria
Polish expatriate sportspeople in Austria
Polish football managers
Ruch Chorzów managers
Arka Gdynia managers
Piast Gliwice managers
Pogoń Szczecin managers
GKS Tychy managers
Bruk-Bet Termalica Nieciecza managers
Zagłębie Sosnowiec managers
GKS Katowice managers
Sandecja Nowy Sącz managers
Association football player-managers
People from Rybnik
Ekstraklasa managers
I liga managers